"Mo rùn geal òg" (My fair young love), alternately known as "Cumha do dh'Uilleam Siseal" (Lament for William Chisholm) is a Scottish Gaelic lament written by Christina Fergusson for her husband, William Chisholm of Strathglass, who was killed at the Battle of Culloden in 1746.

Fergusson was possibly born in Contin, Ross-shire. She was married to William Chisholm, who was a smith, armourer and standard bearer for the Chief of Clan Chisholm. Chisholm was killed at the Battle of Culloden in 1746. In his memory, Ferguson wrote Mo Rùn Geal Òg (My Fair Young Love). In the poem, Christina rebukes Prince Charles Edward Stuart, saying that the loss of her husband in fighting for his cause has left her desolate.

A roadside memorial marks the site of Chisholm and Ferguson's cottage, near Struy in Strathglass.

The song has been performed by several notable singers, including Flora MacNeil, Mary Ann Kennedy, and Anne Lorne Gillies.

References

18th-century Scottish Gaelic poets
Scottish Gaelic women poets
Scottish Gaelic poets
People from Ross and Cromarty
People of the Jacobite rising of 1745
18th-century Scottish women writers